"I'm Not Satisfied" is a song by British pop-rock band Fine Young Cannibals. It was released as the fifth single from the band's 1988 album The Raw and the Cooked. The single charted in the United Kingdom, United States and Canada.

Composition and critical reception
Written by lead vocalist Roland Gift and bassist David Steele, "I'm Not Satisfied" depicts a man who criticizes the weekends for being too short, his girlfriend for being too possessive, and the city for being too depressing. 
Allmusic writer Dave Thompson praised Gift's vocals, saying "so overpowering is his performance, so emotionally devastating is his dissatisfaction, that one is dragged straight into the maelstrom of misery."

Track listing
7" Vinyl (UK)
"I'm Not Satisfied" - 3:46
"I'm Not Satisfied" (The Nicci Edit) - 3:52

12" Vinyl, CD Maxi-Single
"I'm Not Satisfied" (New York Rap Mix) - 4:02
"I'm Not Satisfied" (New York Singing Mix) - 4:00
"I'm Not Satisfied" (The Nicci Version) - 4:34
"I'm Not Satisfied" (Single Version) - 3:46

Chart performance

References

1990 singles
Fine Young Cannibals songs
Songs written by David Steele (musician)
Songs written by Roland Gift
1988 songs
I.R.S. Records singles